Lampropeltis abnorma, commonly known as the Guatemalan milk snake, is a species of milk snake.

References

Lampropeltis
Reptiles of Mexico
Reptiles of Guatemala
Reptiles of Costa Rica
Reptiles of El Salvador
Reptiles of Honduras
Reptiles of Nicaragua
Reptiles described in 1886